Outrageous! is the second studio album by Swedish electronic band Alice in Videoland, released in Sweden on 5 October 2005 by National Records. It features the single "Cut the Crap".

Track listing
"Ladykiller" – 2:19
"Cut the Crap" – 2:59
"Emily" – 2:48
"In Denial" – 4:46
"Better Off" – 3:34
"Radiosong" – 3:35
"Falling" – 3:45
"Bad Boy" – 3:21
"Stuck on My Vision" – 2:49
"Wrapped" – 3:04

Release history

References

2005 albums
Alice in Videoland albums